Dial EV, known for its products, Dmazing and Dia One, is a Chinese automobile manufacturer headquartered in Weinan, Shaanxi, China, specializing in developing electric vehicles.

History
Dial EV was founded in November 2017 and is based in Weinan, Shaanxi, China. Dial EV was funded by Jiangsu Yueda Ventures, IDG Capital, Unicom Tianyi, Alte Automotive, and Huashangtiande. They build a 98 hectare 50,000 unit capacity plant at Weinan, Shaanxi. The plant is constructed at the cost of ¥1.97 billion and was finished in late 2018. The company plans to develop 5 to 6 models by 2023, covering A-level, A0 level, A00 level. And other segments.

Dial EV's first vehicle was the Empire. The original name for the car was the Dial EV Di Xing. It was shown at the 2017 Global Future Mobility Top Forum & International Exhibition and the company's opening event in 2018. It has 3 doors and 2 seats, and is built on the 1D platform. It costs ¥ 150,000 to ¥ 200,000.

Their second vehicle was the Xvista VC3. It was shown at the 2018 Xi'an EV Show. It has 4 doors and 4 seats. It also is built on the 1D platform, and reflects the company's 6S standard (Small, Strong, Standard, Safe, Service, Smart). It takes 5 hours to fully charge.

The Dial EV Xiaowei is the company's third vehicle, which was shown at the 2018 Xi'an EV Show.

Vehicles

Current models
Dial EV currently has 3 production vehicles.

See also
 Aoxin
 Min'an Electric
 ChangJiang

References

Electric vehicle manufacturers of China
Car brands
Car manufacturers of China
Chinese brands